Peter Armstead (birth registered first ¼ 1934) is an English former professional rugby league footballer who played in the 1950s.

Background
Peter Armstead's birth was registered in Dewsbury, West Riding of Yorkshire, England.

Playing career

County Cup Final appearances
Peter Armstead played right-, i.e. number 12, in Wakefield Trinity's 23–5 victory over Hunslet in the 1956–57 Yorkshire County Cup Final during the 1956–57 season at Headingley Rugby Stadium, Leeds on Saturday 20 October 1956.

Notable tour matches
Peter Armstead played right-, i.e. number 12, in Wakefield Trinity's 17–12 victory over Australia in the 1956–57 Kangaroo tour of Great Britain and France match at Belle Vue, Wakefield on Monday 10 December 1956.

References

External links
Search for "Armstead" at rugbyleagueproject.org

1934 births
Living people
Batley Bulldogs players
English rugby league players
Rugby league players from Dewsbury
Rugby league second-rows
Wakefield Trinity players